This article shows all participating men's volleyball squads at the 2005 Bolivarian Games, held from August 13 to 18, 2005 in Pereira, Colombia.

Head Coach: Raúl David García

Head Coach: José A. Rojas

Head Coach:

Head coach: Argemiro Méndez

References
 Official Site

B
B
Bolivarian Games
Volleyball at the Bolivarian Games
B
Bolivarian Games